The Miniature Engineering Craftsmanship Museum (MECM) also known as the Craftmanship Museum is an American museum located in Carlsbad, California, USA that collects and displays unique carefully crafted objects of metal and wood. The museum is sponsored by The Joe Martin Foundation for Exceptional Craftsmanship.

Collection 
The collection includes approximately 500 working miniature engines as well as models of aircraft, automobiles, and other objects.  Especially notable are a 1/6 scale model of a 1932 Duesenberg and several aluminum cutaway World War II fighter models.  A Norden bombsight is displayed in the museum's collection.

1932 SJ Duesenberg 

Louse Chenot constructed a 1/6-scale model of a 1932 SJ Duesenberg. Construction required about 15,000 hours. The engine runs on gasoline. Doors close with two clicks, outside and inside handles operate independently. The model is fully operational, an automobile in miniature.

Machine shop
The museum houses a precision machine shop staffed by volunteer master toolmakers.  The museum's toolmakers work collaboratively with craftsmen throughout the world building miniature projects.  They clean, restore, repair and maintain the objects donated or loaned to the museum.

Exhibits

History
The Craftsmanship Museum first opened in 1996 as an online museum by Joe Martin, owner of the Sherline Company. In 2006, Joe opened a physical museum at the Sherline factory in Vista, California. Within 4 years, the museum outgrew their factory home and Joe decided to create the Joe Martin foundation to purchase a 16,000 square foot building in the Raceway industrial park as a permanent home for the Museum in Carlsbad, just a couple miles from the Sherline factory. Over the years the Museum has expanded its collection of exhibits to include hundreds of working models of all types of miniature machines, engines, architecture, automobiles, and airplanes as well as one-off unique articles of miniature engineering craftsmanship such as a 0.010” diameter bolt with matching nut.

References

External links

Official site

Museums in San Diego County, California
Technology museums in California
Steam museums in the United States
Carlsbad, California